Gregory Merriman, also known as Greg, (born 3 October 1988) is an Australian former competitive ice dancer. With partner Danielle O'Brien, he is a six-time Australian senior national champion and three-time junior national champion. They have competed at the World Championships and Four Continents Championships since 2008, and have competed at three World Junior Championships. They became the first Australian ice dancers to reach the free dance at a World Championships and the second Ice Dance couple from Australia to compete at the Winter Olympics.

Career 
Merriman teamed up with Danielle O'Brien, who also skated at the Canterbury Olympic Ice Rink, in April 1998. They were coached by Australian ice dancing champion Monica MacDonald in Sydney, Australia. In the 2009–10 season, they trained with former World champion Victor Kraatz and Maikki Kraatz. O'Brien/Merriman withdrew from the 2009 Nebelhorn Trophy, the final qualifying opportunity for the 2010 Winter Olympics, due to Merriman's diagnosis of pericarditis, a viral infection in the sac surrounding the heart.

In the 2010–11 season, O'Brien/Merriman began training part-time in Bloomfield Hills, Michigan under coaches Anjelika Krylova, two-time World champion, and Pasquale Camerlengo. They relocated to Detroit to train there full-time in late 2011. Although Merriman's heel of his boot separated during the preliminary round at the 2012 World Championships, they placed eighth out of 23 couples and qualified for the short dance, where they placed 20th and qualified for the free. O'Brien/Merriman became the first Australian team to qualify for the free dance at a World Championships. They finished 20th overall.

In 2012–13, O'Brien/Merriman finished 7th at the US International Classic, 4th at the 2012 Ondrej Nepela Memorial, 8th at the 2012 NRW Trophy and 4th at the 2012 Ice Challenge. In January 2013, they became the first Australian ice dancers to medal at an International event when they took bronze at the Toruń Cup in Poland. In February, O'Brien/Merriman competed at the 2013 Four Continents Championships where they finished with a personal best placement of eighth. They did not qualify for the 2013 World Championships due to new TES requirements.

The 2013 Nebelhorn Trophy was the last chance to qualify for the Olympics; O'Brien/Merriman finished sixth and earned a place for Australia in the Olympic ice dancing event. At the 2014 Winter Olympics, they advanced to the free dance and finished 20th. 

They retired from competition on April 11, 2014.

Programs 
(with O'Brien)

Results 
(with O'Brien)

References

External links 

 

Australian male ice dancers
1988 births
Living people
Figure skaters from Sydney
Figure skaters at the 2014 Winter Olympics
Olympic figure skaters of Australia